Second Coming  is the fourteenth release and ninth studio album by American Christian heavy metal/hard rock band Stryper. The album features re-recorded versions of earlier material as well as two new songs.

Track listing

Personnel 
Stryper
 Michael Sweet – lead and backing vocals, lead and rhythm guitars, guitar solo (1, 2, 3, 5-11, 15, 16)
 Oz Fox – lead and rhythm guitars, guitar solo (1, 3-9, 12, 14), backing vocals
 Tim Gaines – bass, backing vocals
 Robert Sweet – drums, percussion

Additional musicians
 Charles Foley – keyboards, backing vocals
 Paul McNamara – acoustic piano, keyboards

Production 
 Michael Sweet – producer 
 Danny Bernini – engineer, mixing, mastering 
 Kenny Lewis – additional recording, editing 
 Stan-W Decker – artwork, layout 
 Tina Enos – photography 
 Marylin Becrelis – additional photography

References

Stryper albums
2013 albums